A deluge is a large downpour of rain, often a flood.

The Deluge refers to the flood narrative in the Biblical book of Genesis.

Deluge may also refer to:

History
Deluge (history), the Swedish and Russian invasion of the Polish-Lithuanian Commonwealth (1654–1667)
Deluge (prehistoric), prehistoric great floods, some of which may have inspired deluge myths
Après moi, le déluge (lit. 'After me, the flood'), a French expression attributed to King Louis XV of France in 1757

Arts, entertainment, and media

Films
Deluge (film), a 1933 apocalyptic science fiction film loosely based on the S. Fowler Wright novel
The Deluge (film), a 1974 Polish film based on the Sienkiewicz novel

Literature
Deluge (novel), a 1928 novel by S. Fowler Wright
Deluge, a 2008 novel by Anne McCaffrey and Elizabeth Anne Sarborough
Le Déluge (Le Clézio), a fictional work by J. M. G. Le Clézio.
The Deluge (Tooze book), a 2014 book by Adam Tooze
The Deluge (novel), Potop, an 1886 novel by Nobel Prize winner Henryk Sienkiewicz about the historical event
The Deluge, a 1954 pastiche story credited to Leonardo da Vinci, actually written by Robert Payne
The Deluge, a 2007 novel by Mark Morris
The Deluge, a 2023 novel by Stephen Markley

Music
Deluge, a 1997 album  by Jocelyn Pook
Le Déluge (Saint-Saëns), an 1875 oratorio by Camille Saint-Saëns
The Deluge (album), a 1986 album by Manilla Road

Other uses in arts, entertainment, and media
Deluge (fine art photography), a museum exhibit by David LaChapelle
Deluge (Transformers), several Transformers characters
The Deluge, a painting by Winifred Knights

Firefighting
Deluge (fireboat), several vessels
A type of fire sprinkler system
Deluge gun, equipment used in firefighting

Other uses
Deluge (software), a cross-platform BitTorrent client written using Python and GTK
Deluge Fountain, in Bydgoszcz, Poland
Deluge Mountain, a summit in Canada

See also
Flood (disambiguation)
Flood myth, mythic floods in general